Josef Pospíšil (born 19 April 1953) is a Czech former skier. He competed in the Nordic combined event at the 1976 Winter Olympics.

References

External links
 

1953 births
Living people
Czech male Nordic combined skiers
Olympic Nordic combined skiers of Czechoslovakia
Nordic combined skiers at the 1976 Winter Olympics
People from Nové Město na Moravě
Sportspeople from the Vysočina Region